London's Burning is a board game first published by Avalon Hill in 1995. It was designed by Ben Knight and Mark Simonitch.

Description
London's Burning is a solitaire game of the Battle of Britain.

Reception
Ted S. Raicer comments: "London's Burning has a lot more going for it as a wargame than just its subject matter — it is one of the most multifaceted and imaginative game designs in the 50-year history of commercial wargaming. It provides real insight into the historical events it portrays. And, oh yes, it's also a great deal of fun to play."

References

Avalon Hill games
Board games about history
Board games introduced in 1995